Bremer Straßenbahn AG (translates from German as Bremen Tramways Corporation), often abbreviated BSAG, is the public transport provider for Bremen, Germany, offering tramway and bus services.

See also
List of town tramway systems in Germany
Trams in Bremen
Trams in Germany

References

Notes

Bibliography

External links
 BSAG official website
 Tram Travels: Bremer Straßenbahn (BSAG)
 

Transport in Bremen (city)
Bremen